His Bloody Project: Documents relating to the case of Roderick Macrae is a 2015 novel by Graeme Macrae Burnet. Using fictional historical documents, it tells the story of a 17-year-old boy named Roderick "Roddy" Macrae, who commits a triple homicide in the village of Culduie, on the Applecross peninsula, in 1869.

Synopsis
The book is the story of the young man Roddy Macrae and his animosity with the local constable, Lachlan Broad.

Reception
In September 2016, it was shortlisted for the 2016 Man Booker Prize. In October 2016, His Bloody Project became the largest-selling book in the Booker shortlist.

References

2015 British novels
British crime novels
Fiction set in 1869
Novels set in Highland (council area)